Owen Samuels was an American football coach.  He served as the fifth head football coach for Emporia State University in Emporia, Kansas and he held that position for the 1907 season. His record at Emporia State was 1–6.

Head coaching record

References

Year of birth missing
Year of death missing
Emporia State Hornets football coaches